Manna-Dora is either a nearly extinct Dravidian language closely related to Telugu, or a dialect of Telugu. It is spoken by the eponymous Scheduled Tribe in the state of Andhra Pradesh, India.

References

Agglutinative languages
Scheduled Tribes of Andhra Pradesh